Vicki Yohe (born July 13, 1965) is a  gospel singer, songwriter, and worship leader. She was born in Normal, Illinois and raised in Rapid City, South Dakota. She sang her first solo at the age of five. Her family moved to Hammond, Louisiana when she was 14. At age 19, she accepted the position of music director at a church near Baton Rouge.

Career
In 1992, she recorded her self-titled independent debut album. This brought the attention of Giant Records, who signed her in 1994. She is best known for the songs "The Mercy Seat" and "Because Of Who You Are"—for which she received a Dove Award nomination, and for regularly performing on TBN's Praise the Lord program. It was through her television appearance that CeCe Winans offered her the chance to sign with Winans' new Pure Springs Gospel label. Yohe's first release from the label was 2003's I Just Want You.

Controversy over support of Donald Trump
In January 2017, in response to the Women's March in Washington, DC, Yohe posted a meme to her Instagram account, a photo of an actor dressed as Jesus carrying suitcases with the words, "On my way back to the White House." She added comments in support of President Donald Trump, saying that marches and protests would be ineffective, and that "You know you are doing something right when there is so much opposition!!!". The post attracted immediate criticism from her predominantly-Black followers and from activist Shaun King; Yohe soon shut down most of her social media presence and posted an apology to Facebook, saying that she "never want[ed] to ever hurt anyone and that has never been [her] intention," but that she felt that President Obama's policies "many times went against what most Christians believe". She wrote that many churches had canceled ministry events with her, and that she had been called a racist for her support of the controversial President.

Discography
1992: Vicki Yohe
1994: Everlasting Love
1995: I Give You Me
1997: He Knows My Heart
2000: The Best of Vicki Yohe
2000: Christmas Presence
2001: Beyond This Song
2003: I Just Want You
2005: He's Been Faithful
2009: Reveal Your Glory: Live from the Cathedral (CD & DVD)
2011: I'm at Peace
2013: Free Worshiper

Accolades
2004: GMA Dove Award nomination for Contemporary Gospel Recorded Song of the Year for "Because of Who You Are"
2006: Stellar Award nomination for the album He's Been Faithful

References

Notes
. Triple exclamation points in original

External links

1965 births
American women singer-songwriters
American gospel singers
20th-century American singers
21st-century American singers
Living people
20th-century American women singers
21st-century American women singers
People from Normal, Illinois
Singer-songwriters from Illinois
People from Rapid City, South Dakota
Singer-songwriters from South Dakota